Fear Street is a teenage horror fiction series written by American author R. L. Stine, starting in 1989. In 1995, a series of books inspired by the Fear Street series, called Ghosts of Fear Street, was created for younger readers, and were more like the Goosebumps books in that they featured paranormal adversaries (monsters, aliens, etc.) and sometimes had twist endings.

R. L. Stine stopped writing Fear Street after penning the Fear Street Seniors spin-off in 1999. In summer 2005, he brought Fear Street back with the three-part Fear Street Nights miniseries.

, over 80 million copies of Fear Street have been sold.

R. L. Stine revived the book series in October 2014. In July 2021, a trilogy of films based on the franchise was released over the course of three weeks on Netflix.

Plot summary

The Fear Street books take place in the fictionalized town of Shadyside and feature average teenagers older than the typical Goosebumps preteens, who encounter malignant, sometimes paranormal, adversaries. While some of the Fear Street novels have paranormal elements, such as ghosts, others are simply murder mysteries. Whereas the Goosebumps books have a few tamed deaths, the deaths presented in Fear Street, particularly the sagas, are far more gruesome, with more blood and gore.

The title of the series comes from the name of a fictional street in Shadyside, which was named after the Fear family. Their name was originally spelled as Fier; after being told that the family was cursed and that the letters could be rearranged to spell "fire", Simon Fier changed it to Fear in the 19th century. Despite the family renaming, the curse survived, and Simon and his wife, Angelica, brought it with them when they moved to Shadyside sometime after the Civil War. 

The curse started in Puritan (17th-century) times when Benjamin and Matthew Fier sentenced an innocent girl and her mother, Susannah and Martha Goode, to be burned at the stake for allegedly practicing witchcraft. The father and husband, William Goode, put the curse on the Fiers to avenge their deaths, bringing misery and death to the family. Although a fire allegedly burned the last of the Fears, the series features some surviving Fears and suggests that one of the brothers survived. These events are described in the Fear Street Sagas, a spinoff of the main series.

Similar to the Goosebumps series, the characters change in each book, although some characters still live on and are mentioned (or show up) multiple times. Some of the previously-released novels' plots are also mentioned in later books, and some characters appear in multiple stories (for instance, Cory Brooks, hero of The New Girl, is mentioned and shows up several times during the later novels). The plot for the books occurs between the late 1980s and early 1990s, although multiple novels occur within the same chronological year.

Setting

The Fear Street series takes place in a town called Shadyside. Much of the paranormal activity, the murders and other unexplained happenings occur either directly on Fear Street, in the woods surrounding the street or on Fear Island which sits in the middle of Fear Lake. Contextual clues in the text suggest Shadyside is either in southern New England or a northern Mid-Atlantic state of the US. For example, in book #3, The Overnight, a character mentions that he goes to BU "up in Boston", suggesting Shadyside is somewhere near Boston, but south of it.

According to descriptions in  book #1, The New Girl, the Canononka River runs behind Shadyside Park, which sits behind Shadyside High School. Between the school and the park, multiple books mention a parking lot, alternately referred to as the teacher's lot and the student lot. From here, you can see a practice field and tennis courts. In book #4, Missing, it is mentioned that the Canononka River marks the edge of town, suggesting that the river makes up some portion of Shadyside's city limit.

The Fear Street woods are situated between Fear Street and the rest of town, although some books suggest the woods are located at the end of the street. If you were to walk from Fear Street, straight through the woods, you would end up in another Shadyside neighborhood; people's backyards meet the woods in this neighborhood. However, it is very difficult to maintain a straight path, since the woods are so full of undergrowth. Also of note: “There are no birds in the Fear Street woods. Scientists from all over the country haven’t been able to find out why.”

Division Street cuts Shadyside into North and South halves; on this street sits the local mall. Division Street crosses Old Mill Road, which then crosses Fear Street, which is in the southern half of town. From this description, it seems reasonable to assume that Fear Street runs at least somewhat parallel to Division Street. The eponymous street is described as winding, with no clear view from end to end. Somewhere on this street sits the burned out shell of Fear Mansion.  According to book #5, The Wrong Number, there is a cemetery near the East end of Fear Street, which is also bordered by the Fear Street woods. 

At some point in the timeline, between book #1, The New Girl and book #3, The Overnight, the "...ancient collapsing mill built at the end of Old Mill Road before the town of Shadyside even existed, had recently been resurrected and re-opened as a teen dance club called The Mill." Old Mill Road crosses Hawthorne Drive, where you can find a small coffee shop called Alma's; this is the haunt of many local college kids. 

There is a neighborhood called North Hills, which is distinctly different from the rest of Shadyside; it has large houses and well tended lawns. It is described as "...a quiet, peaceful neighborhood, the nicest neighborhood in Shadyside." Multiple books mention a neighborhood called the Old Village and it seems to be Shadyside's downtown/old town, with multiple businesses. 

Waynesbridge is a town about a 20 minute drive from Shadyside. Between the two towns, there is a business park where a company called Cranford Industries makes its home.

Release

The first Fear Street book, The New Girl was published in 1989. Various spin-off series were written, including the Fear Street Sagas and Ghosts of Fear Street. , more than 80 million Fear Street books have been sold. Individual books appeared in many bestseller lists, including the USA Today and Publishers Weekly bestseller list.

After a hiatus, R. L. Stine revived the book series in October 2014. Stine had attempted to write a new Fear Street novel for years, but publishers were not interested. Some publishers thought that young adult literature has changed since Fear Street was first published, since the new world of young adult literature is dominated by dystopian worlds and paranormal elements. After Stine told his followers on Twitter that there were no publishers interested in reviving Fear Street, Kat Brzozowski, an editor at St. Martin's Press, contacted him. Initially, the publisher bought three new books, but it was later announced that six new books would be published in the series.

Party Games, the first book, was first published on September 30, 2014, in hardcover. The novel is Stine's first Fear Street novel since the last book in the Fear Street Nights series was published in 2005. The novel was followed by Don't Stay Up Late, which was published in April 2015. Stine stated the new books are longer, more adult and more violent, to reflect how young adult literature has changed since Fear Street was first published.

Adaptations

Television 
At some point before October 1997, Viacom Productions had inked a development deal with Parachute Entertainment to produce a primetime TV series based on the Fear Street books. Soon after Disney-owned ABC bought a Fear Street pilot. The pilot episode for the unproduced Fear Street television series, titled Ghosts of Fear Street, aired on ABC Television on July 31, 1998. The pilot's airing  held 89% of its men 18-34 lead-in but just 55% of its women 18-34 lead-in. The result was ABC's worst rating on record in that slot and a third-place finish for the night in homes and adults 18-49.

Film

On October 30, 1997, Variety reported Hollywood Pictures struck a deal to acquire the Fear Street series of books, which were set to be developed with Parachute Entertainment as a Scream-like feature franchise.

On October 9, 2015, TheWrap reported a film based on the series was again being developed, by 20th Century Fox and Chernin Entertainment. On February 13, 2017, The Tracking Board reported that Kyle Killen would write the script for the film. On July 13, 2017, Variety reported that Leigh Janiak would oversee the development of the scripts as a trilogy, and direct the first film. On February 27, 2019, it was announced that Kiana Madeira and Olivia Welch would star as the lead characters in the trilogy. On March 12, 2019, Deadline Hollywood reported that Benjamin Flores, Jr. would play Josh, while Ashley Zukerman, Fred Hechinger, Julia Rehwald and Jeremy Ford joined the cast on March 27. On April 1, 2019, Gillian Jacobs, Sadie Sink, Emily Rudd and McCabe Slye were cast in the second film.

On March 13, 2019, filming for the first film began in East Point, Georgia. Janiak directed all three films in the series, after originally being set to direct the first and third films. Alex Ross Perry was previously set to direct the second film. Phil Graziadei and Janiak received screenplay credit, and with a "story by" co-credit shared by Killen, Graziadei, and Janiak.

While the trilogy had finished filming in September 2019, the series was placed in an uncertain status with the early termination of the Chernin Entertainment and 20th Century Fox production deal. On April 7, 2020, it was announced that Chernin Entertainment ended their distribution deal with 20th Century Studios, and made a multi-year first-look deal with Netflix. On August 11, 2020, it was reported that Netflix had acquired the trilogy for a planned mid-2021 release date with the original release strategy of one film per month. On May 19, 2021, Netflix announced the films to be released over three weeks, with Fear Street Part One: 1994 on July 2, Fear Street Part Two: 1978 on July 9, and Fear Street Part Three: 1666 on July 16.

References

External links
Booklists at R. L. Stine's Official Site

 
Book series introduced in 1989
Novel sequences
Young adult novel series
American young adult novels
American horror novels
Works by R. L. Stine